Rumacon canescens is a species of beetle in the family Cerambycidae. It was described by Bruch in 1926.

References

Aerenicini
Beetles described in 1926